The United States Department of Justice National Security Division (NSD) handles national security functions of the department. Created by the 2005 USA PATRIOT Act reauthorization, the division consolidated all of the department's national security and intelligence functions into a single division. The division is headed by the Assistant Attorney General for National Security.

History
The National Security Division was created under Section 506 of the 2005 USA PATRIOT Act reauthorization, which was signed into law by President George W. Bush on March 9, 2006.

It consolidated the department's national security efforts within one unit, bringing together attorneys from the Counterterrorism Section and Counterespionage Section of the Criminal Division and from the Office of Intelligence Policy and Review (OIPR), with their specialized expertise in the Foreign Intelligence Surveillance Act and other intelligence matters. This fulfilled a recommendation of the Iraq Intelligence Commission (Commission on the Intelligence Capabilities of the United States Regarding Weapons of Mass Destruction).

In 2010, its budget was $88 million.

Leadership
The head of the National Security Division is an Assistant Attorney General for National Security (AAG-NS) appointed by the President of the United States. Matthew G. Olsen, the current AAG-NS, was confirmed to the role with the advice and consent of the Senate. Previously, John Demers, the AAG-NS appointed under President Donald Trump, continued to serve under the incoming President Joe Biden administration, but he left the role in June 2021 in the wake of news reports that the Justice officials had seized the phone records of Congressional members and staff.

Organization
The National Security Division is overseen by the Assistant Attorney General with whom the Principal Deputy Assistant Attorney General oversees the Executive Office - The office that administers the entire division.  In assistance are four deputy assistant attorneys general, all career civil servants, whom oversee each section.

Counterintelligence and Export Control Section - Responsible for supervising investigations and prosecutions relating to espionage, or trafficking of national security information and military hardware.
Counterterrorism Section - Responsible for supporting Law Enforcement efforts, policy and strategy in combatting international and domestic terrorism.
Foreign Investment and Review Section - Responsible for investigating and mitigating foreign investment in critical U.S. infrastructure and commerce.
Office of Law and Policy - Responsible for developing national security policies and strategies within the Justice Department.
Office of Intelligence - Responsible for legal and regulatory oversight of the U.S. Intelligence Community.  The office contains three sections
Operations Section - Responsible for pursuing legal authorization of U.S. Intelligence Operations and representing the government in a FISA Court.
Oversight Section - Responsible for oversight of the Intelligence Community and ensuring full legal compliance and protection of individual privacy and civil liberties. 
Litigation Section - Responsible for handling information gathered from FISA-related activities and preparation of the information for litigation.
Office of Justice for Victims of Overseas Terrorism - Responsible for working with terrorism victims and their families to pursue and prosecute the culprits.

Controversies
In December 2019, Michael Horowitz, the Inspector General of the DoJ released a report accusing the Division of lying to the Foreign Intelligence Surveillance Court in some of its applications for wiretaps.  The Presiding Judge of the Court subsequently ordered the Division to "inform the Court in a sworn written submission of what it has done, and plans to do, to ensure that the statement of facts in each FBI application accurately and completely reflects information possessed by the FBI that is material to any issue presented by the application."

List of assistant attorneys general

See also
 FBI National Security Branch

References

External links
 

National Security Division
Counterintelligence agencies
Government agencies established in 2006